Martin Ludwig Bormann (17 June 1900 – 2 May 1945) was a German Nazi Party official and head of the Nazi Party Chancellery. He gained immense power by using his position as Adolf Hitler's private secretary to control the flow of information and access to Hitler. He used his position to create an extensive bureaucracy and involve himself as much as possible in the decision making.

Bormann joined a paramilitary Freikorps organisation in 1922 while working as manager of a large estate. He served nearly a year in prison as an accomplice to his friend Rudolf Höss (later commandant of Auschwitz concentration camp) in the murder of Walther Kadow. Bormann joined the Nazi Party in 1927 and the Schutzstaffel (SS) in 1937. He initially worked in the party's insurance service, and transferred in July 1933 to the office of Deputy Führer Rudolf Hess, where he served as chief of staff.

Bormann gained acceptance into Hitler's inner circle and accompanied him everywhere, providing briefings and summaries of events and requests. He began acting as Hitler's personal secretary on 12 August 1935. After Hess's solo flight to Britain on 10 May 1941 to seek peace negotiations with the British government, Bormann assumed Hess's former duties, with the title of Head of the Parteikanzlei (Party Chancellery). He had final approval over civil service appointments, reviewed and approved legislation, and by 1943 had de facto control over all domestic matters. Bormann was one of the leading proponents of the ongoing persecution of the Christian churches and favoured harsh treatment of Jews and Slavs in the areas conquered by Germany during World War II.

Bormann returned with Hitler to the Führerbunker in Berlin on 16 January 1945 as the Red Army approached the city. After Hitler committed suicide, Bormann and others attempted to flee Berlin on 2 May to avoid capture by the Soviets. Bormann probably committed suicide on a bridge near Lehrter station. His body was buried nearby on 8 May 1945, but was not found and confirmed as Bormann's until 1973; the identification was reaffirmed in 1998 by DNA tests. The missing Bormann was tried in absentia by the International Military Tribunal in the Nuremberg trials of 1945 and 1946. He was convicted of war crimes and crimes against humanity and sentenced to death by hanging.

Early life and education
Born in Wegeleben (now in Saxony-Anhalt) in the Kingdom of Prussia in the German Empire, Bormann was the son of Theodor Bormann (1862–1903), a post office employee, and his second wife, Antonie Bernhardine Mennong. The family was Lutheran. He had two half-siblings (Else and Walter Bormann) from his father's earlier marriage to Louise Grobler, who died in 1898. Antonie Bormann gave birth to three sons, one of whom died in infancy. Martin and Albert (1902–89) survived to adulthood. Theodor died when Bormann was three, and his mother soon remarried.

Bormann's studies at an agricultural trade high school were interrupted when he joined the 55th Field Artillery Regiment as a gunner in June 1918, in the final months of World War I. He never saw action, but served garrison duty until February 1919. After working a short time in a cattle feed mill, Bormann became estate manager of a large farm in Mecklenburg. Shortly after starting work at the estate, Bormann joined an antisemitic landowners association. While hyperinflation in the Weimar Republic meant that money was worthless, foodstuffs stored on farms and estates became ever more valuable. Many estates, including Bormann's, had Freikorps units stationed on site to guard the crops from pillaging. Bormann joined the Freikorps organisation headed by Gerhard Roßbach in 1922, acting as section leader and treasurer.

On 17 March 1924 Bormann was sentenced to a year in Elisabethstrasse Prison as an accomplice to his friend Rudolf Höss in the murder of Walther Kadow. The perpetrators believed Kadow had tipped off the French occupation authorities in the Ruhr District that fellow Freikorps member Albert Leo Schlageter was carrying out sabotage operations against French industries. Schlageter was arrested and was executed on 26 May 1923. On the night of 31 May, Höss, Bormann and several others took Kadow into a meadow out of town, where he was beaten and had his throat cut. After one of the perpetrators confessed, police dug up the body and laid charges in July. Bormann was released from prison in February 1925. He joined the Frontbann, a short-lived Nazi Party paramilitary organisation created to replace the Sturmabteilung (SA; storm detachment or assault division), which had been banned in the aftermath of the failed Munich Putsch. Bormann returned to his job at Mecklenburg and remained there until May 1926, when he moved in with his mother in Oberweimar.

Career in the Nazi Party
In 1927, Bormann joined the Nazi Party (NSDAP). His membership number was 60,508. He joined the Schutzstaffel (SS) on 1 January 1937 with number 278,267. By special order of Heinrich Himmler in 1938, Bormann was granted SS number 555 to reflect his Alter Kämpfer (Old Fighter) status.

Early career

Bormann took a job with Der Nationalsozialist, a weekly paper edited by Nazi Party member Hans Severus Ziegler, who was deputy Gauleiter (party leader) for Thuringia. After joining the Nazi Party in 1927, Bormann began duties as regional press officer, but his lack of public-speaking skills made him ill-suited to this position. He soon put his organisational skills to use as business manager for the Gau (region). He moved to Munich in October 1928, where he worked in the SA insurance office. Initially the Nazi Party provided coverage through insurance companies for members who were hurt or killed in the frequent violent skirmishes with members of other political parties. As insurance companies were unwilling to pay out claims for such activities, in 1930 Bormann set up the Hilfskasse der NSDAP (Nazi Party Auxiliary Fund), a benefits and relief fund directly administered by the party. Each party member was required to pay premiums and might receive compensation for injuries sustained while conducting party business. Payments out of the fund were made solely at Bormann's discretion. He began to gain a reputation as a financial expert, and many party members felt personally indebted to him after receiving benefits from the fund. In addition to its stated purpose, the fund was used as a last-resort source of funding for the Nazi Party, which was chronically short of money at that time. After the Nazi Party's success in the 1930 general election, where they won 107 seats, party membership grew dramatically.

Bormann also worked on the staff of the SA from 1928 to 1930, and while there he founded the National Socialist Automobile Corps, precursor to the National Socialist Motor Corps. The organisation was responsible for co-ordinating the donated use of motor vehicles belonging to party members, and later expanded to training members in automotive skills.

Reichsleiter and head of the party chancellery
After the Machtergreifung (Nazi Party seizure of power) in January 1933, the relief fund was repurposed to provide general accident and property insurance, so Bormann resigned from its administration. He applied for a transfer and was accepted as chief of staff in the office of Rudolf Hess, the Deputy Führer, on 1 July 1933. Bormann also served as personal secretary to Hess from July 1933 until 12 May 1941. Hess's department was responsible for settling disputes within the party and acted as an intermediary between the party and the state regarding policy decisions and legislation. Bormann used his position to create an extensive bureaucracy and involve himself in as much of the decision-making as possible. On 10 October 1933 Hitler named Bormann Reichsleiter (national leader – the second highest political rank) of the Nazi Party, and in November he was named Reichstag deputy. By June 1934, Bormann was gaining acceptance into Hitler's inner circle and accompanied him everywhere, providing briefings and summaries of events and requests.

In 1935, Bormann was appointed as overseer of renovations at the Berghof, Hitler's property at Obersalzberg. In the early 1930s, Hitler bought the property, which he had been renting since 1925 as a vacation retreat. After he became chancellor, Hitler drew up plans for expansion and remodelling of the main house and put Bormann in charge of construction. Bormann commissioned the construction of barracks for the SS guards, roads and footpaths, garages for motor vehicles, a guesthouse, accommodation for staff, and other amenities. Retaining title in his own name, Bormann bought up adjacent farms until the entire complex covered . Members of the inner circle built houses within the perimeter, beginning with Hermann Göring, Albert Speer, and Bormann himself. Bormann commissioned the building of the Kehlsteinhaus (Eagle's Nest), a tea house high above the Berghof, as a gift to Hitler on his fiftieth birthday (20 April 1939). Hitler seldom used the building, but Bormann liked to impress guests by taking them there.

While Hitler was in residence at the Berghof, Bormann was constantly in attendance and acted as Hitler's personal secretary. In this capacity, he began to control the flow of information and access to Hitler. During this period, Hitler gave Bormann control of his personal finances. In addition to salaries as chancellor and president, Hitler's income included money raised through royalties collected on his book Mein Kampf and the use of his image on postage stamps. Bormann set up the Adolf Hitler Fund of German Trade and Industry, which collected money from German industrialists on Hitler's behalf. Some of the funds received through this programme were disbursed to various party leaders, but Bormann retained most of it for Hitler's personal use. Bormann and others took notes of Hitler's thoughts expressed over dinner and in monologues late into the night and preserved them. The material was published after the war as Hitler's Table Talk.

The office of the Deputy Führer had final approval over civil service appointments, and Bormann reviewed the personnel files and made the decisions regarding appointments. This power impinged on the purview of Minister of the Interior Wilhelm Frick, and was an example of the overlapping responsibilities typical of the Nazi regime. Bormann travelled everywhere with Hitler, including trips to Austria in 1938 after the Anschluss (the annexation of Austria into Nazi Germany), and to the Sudetenland after the signing of the Munich Agreement later that year. Bormann was placed in charge of organising the 1938 Nuremberg Rally, a major annual party event.

Hitler intentionally played top party members against one another and the Nazi Party against the civil service. In this way, he fostered distrust, competition, and infighting among his subordinates to consolidate and maximise his own power. He typically did not give written orders; instead he communicated with them verbally or had them conveyed through Bormann. Falling out of favour with Bormann meant that access to Hitler was cut off. Bormann proved to be a master of intricate political infighting. Along with his ability to control access to Hitler, this enabled him to curtail the power of Joseph Goebbels, Göring, Himmler, Alfred Rosenberg, Robert Ley, Hans Frank, Speer, and other high-ranking officials, many of whom became his enemies. This ruthless and continuous infighting for power, influence, and Hitler's favour came to characterise the inner workings of the Third Reich.

As World War II progressed, Hitler's attention became focused on foreign affairs and the conduct of the war to the exclusion of all else. Hess, not directly engaged in either of these endeavours, became increasingly sidelined from the affairs of the nation and from Hitler's attention; Bormann had successfully supplanted Hess in many of his duties and usurped his position at Hitler's side. Hess was concerned that Germany would face a war on two fronts as plans progressed for Operation Barbarossa, the invasion of the Soviet Union scheduled to take place later that year. He flew solo to Britain on 10 May 1941 to seek peace negotiations with the British government. He was arrested on arrival and spent the rest of the war as a British prisoner, eventually receiving a life sentence – for crimes against peace (planning and preparing a war of aggression), and conspiracy with other German leaders to commit crimes – at the Nuremberg trials in 1946. Speer later said Hitler described Hess's departure as one of the worst blows of his life, as he considered it a personal betrayal. Hitler ordered Hess to be shot should he return to Germany and abolished the post of Deputy Führer on 12 May 1941, assigning Hess's former duties to Bormann, with the title of Head of the Parteikanzlei (Party Chancellery). In this position he was responsible for all Nazi Party appointments, and was answerable only to Hitler. By a Führer decree (Führererlass) on 29 May, Bormann also succeeded Hess on the six-member Council of Ministers for Defense of the Reich, which operated as a war cabinet. He simultaneously was awarded cabinet rank equivalent to a Reichsminister without portfolio. Associates began to refer to him as the "Brown Eminence", although never to his face.

Bormann's power and effective reach broadened considerably during the war. By early 1943, the war produced a labour crisis for the regime. Hitler created a three-man committee with representatives of the State, the army, and the Party in an attempt to centralise control of the war economy. The committee members were Hans Lammers (head of the Reich Chancellery), Field Marshal Wilhelm Keitel, chief of the Oberkommando der Wehrmacht (Armed Forces High Command; OKW), and Bormann, who controlled the Party. The committee was intended to independently propose measures regardless of the wishes of various ministries, with Hitler reserving most final decisions to himself. The committee, soon known as the Dreierausschuß (Committee of Three), met eleven times between January and August 1943. However, they ran up against resistance from Hitler's cabinet ministers, who headed deeply entrenched spheres of influence and were excluded from the committee. Seeing it as a threat to their power, Goebbels, Göring, and Speer worked together to bring it down. The result was that nothing changed, and the Committee of Three declined into irrelevance.

Role in Kirchenkampf
While Article 24 of the National Socialist Program called for conditional toleration of Christian denominations and a Reichskonkordat (Reich Concordat) treaty with the Vatican was signed in 1933, purporting to guarantee religious freedom for Catholics, Hitler believed that Christianity was fundamentally incompatible with Nazism. Bormann, who was strongly anti-Christian, agreed; he stated publicly in 1941 that "National Socialism and Christianity are irreconcilable." Out of political expediency, Hitler intended to postpone the elimination of the Christian churches until after the war. However, his repeated hostile statements against the church indicated to his subordinates that a continuation of the Kirchenkampf (church struggle) would be tolerated and even encouraged.

Bormann was one of the leading proponents of the ongoing persecution of the Christian churches. In February 1937, he decreed that members of the clergy should not be admitted to the Nazi Party. The following year he ruled that any members of the clergy who were holding party offices should be dismissed, and that any party member who was considering entering the clergy had to give up his party membership. While Bormann's push to force the closure of theological departments at Reich universities was unsuccessful, he was able to reduce the amount of religious instruction provided in public schools to two hours per week and mandated the removal of crucifixes from classrooms. Speer notes in his memoirs that while drafting plans for Welthauptstadt Germania, the planned rebuilding of Berlin, he was told by Bormann that churches were not to be allocated any building sites.

As part of the campaign against the Catholic Church, hundreds of monasteries in Germany and Austria were confiscated by the Gestapo and their occupants were expelled. In 1941 the Catholic Bishop of Münster, Clemens August Graf von Galen, publicly protested against this persecution and against Action T4, the Nazi involuntary euthanasia programme under which the mentally ill, physically deformed, and incurably sick were to be killed. In a series of sermons that received international attention, he criticised the programme as illegal and immoral. His sermons led to a widespread protest movement among church leaders, the strongest protest against a Nazi policy up until that point. Bormann and others called for Galen to be hanged, but Hitler and Goebbels concluded that Galen's death would only be viewed as a martyrdom and lead to further unrest. Hitler decided to deal with the issue when the war was over.

George Mosse wrote of Bormann's beliefs:

Richard Overy describes Bormann as an atheist.

Personal Secretary to the Führer
Preoccupied with military matters and spending most of his time at his military headquarters on the eastern front, Hitler came to rely more and more on Bormann to handle the domestic policies of the country. On 12 April 1943, Hitler officially appointed Bormann as Personal Secretary to the Führer. By this time Bormann had de facto control over all domestic matters, and this new appointment gave him the power to act in an official capacity in any matter.

Bormann was invariably the advocate of extremely harsh, radical measures when it came to the treatment of Jews, the conquered eastern peoples, and prisoners of war. He signed the decree of 31 May 1941 extending the 1935 Nuremberg Laws to the annexed territories of the East. Thereafter, he signed the decree of 9 October 1942 prescribing that the permanent Final Solution in Greater Germany could no longer be solved by emigration, but only by the use of "ruthless force in the special camps of the East", that is, extermination in Nazi death camps. A further decree, signed by Bormann on 1 July 1943, gave Adolf Eichmann absolute powers over Jews, who now came under the exclusive jurisdiction of the Gestapo. Historian Richard J. Evans estimates that 5.5 to 6 million Jews, representing two-thirds of the Jewish population of Europe, were exterminated by the Nazi regime in the course of The Holocaust.

Knowing Hitler viewed the Slavs as inferior, Bormann opposed the introduction of German criminal law into the conquered eastern territories. He lobbied for and eventually achieved a strict separate penal code that implemented martial law for the Polish and Jewish inhabitants of these areas. The "Edict on Criminal Law Practices against Poles and Jews in the Incorporated Eastern Territories", promulgated 4 December 1941, permitted corporal punishment and death sentences for even the most trivial of offences.

Bormann supported the hard-line approach of Erich Koch, Reichskommissar in Reichskommissariat Ukraine, in his brutal treatment of Slavic people. Alfred Rosenberg, serving as head of the Reich Ministry for the Occupied Eastern Territories, favoured a more moderate policy. After touring collective farms around Vinnytsia, Ukraine, Bormann was concerned about the health and good physical constitution of the population, as he was concerned that they could constitute a danger to the regime. After discussion with Hitler, he issued a policy directive to Rosenberg that read in part:

Bormann and Himmler shared responsibility for the Volkssturm (people's militia), which drafted all remaining able-bodied men aged 16 to 60 into a last-ditch militia founded on 18 October 1944. Poorly equipped and trained, the men were sent to fight on the eastern front, where nearly 175,000 of them were killed without having any discernible impact on the Soviet advance.

Last days in Berlin
Hitler transferred his headquarters to the Führerbunker ("Leader's bunker") in Berlin on 16 January 1945, where he (along with Bormann, his secretary Else Krüger, and others) remained until the end of April. The Führerbunker was located under the Reich Chancellery garden in the government district of the city centre. The Battle of Berlin, the final major Soviet offensive of the war, began on 16 April 1945. By 19 April, the Red Army started to encircle the city. On 20 April, his 56th birthday, Hitler made his last trip above ground. In the ruined garden of the Reich Chancellery, he awarded Iron Crosses to boy soldiers of the Hitler Youth. That afternoon, Berlin was bombarded by Soviet artillery for the first time. On 23 April, Albert Bormann left the bunker complex and flew to the Obersalzberg. He and several others had been ordered by Hitler to leave Berlin.

In the early morning hours of 29 April 1945, Wilhelm Burgdorf, Goebbels, Hans Krebs, and Bormann witnessed and signed Hitler's last will and testament. In the will, Hitler described Bormann as "my most faithful Party comrade" and named him executor of the estate. That same night, Hitler married Eva Braun in a civil ceremony.

As Soviet forces continued to fight their way into the centre of Berlin, Hitler and Braun committed suicide on the afternoon of 30 April. Braun took cyanide and Hitler shot himself. Pursuant to Hitler's instructions, their bodies were carried up to the Reich Chancellery garden and burned. In accordance with Hitler's last wishes, Bormann was named as Party Minister, thus officially confirming that he held the top position in the Party. Grand Admiral Karl Dönitz was appointed as the new Reichspräsident (President of Germany) and Goebbels became head of government and Chancellor of Germany. Hitler did not name any successor as Führer or as leader of the Nazi Party. Goebbels and his wife Magda committed suicide the next day.

On 2 May, the Battle in Berlin ended when General der Artillerie Helmuth Weidling, commander of the Berlin Defence Area, unconditionally surrendered the city to General Vasily Chuikov, commander of the Soviet 8th Guards Army.

Death, rumours of survival and discovery of remains

Axmann's account of Bormann's death
At around 11:00 pm on 1 May, Bormann left the Führerbunker with SS doctor Ludwig Stumpfegger, Hitler Youth leader Artur Axmann, and Hitler's pilot Hans Baur, part of one of the groups attempting to break out of the Soviet encirclement. Bormann carried with him a copy of Hitler's last will and testament. The group left the Führerbunker and travelled on foot via a U-Bahn subway tunnel to the Friedrichstraße station, where they surfaced. Several members of the party attempted to cross the Spree River at the Weidendammer Bridge while crouching behind a Tiger tank. The tank was hit by an anti-tank round and Bormann and Stumpfegger were knocked to the ground. Bormann, Stumpfegger, and several others eventually crossed the river on their third attempt. Bormann, Stumpfegger, and Axmann walked along the railway tracks to Lehrter station, where Axmann decided to leave the others and go in the opposite direction. When he encountered a Red Army patrol, Axmann doubled back. He saw two bodies, which he later identified as Bormann and Stumpfegger, on a bridge near the railway switching yard. He did not have time to check thoroughly, so he did not know how they died. Since the Soviets never admitted to finding Bormann's body, his fate remained in doubt for many years.

Tried at Nuremberg in absentia
During the chaotic days after the war, contradictory reports arose as to Bormann's whereabouts. Sightings were reported in Argentina, Spain, and elsewhere. Bormann's wife was placed under surveillance in case he tried to contact her. Jakob Glas, Bormann's long-time chauffeur, insisted that he saw Bormann in Munich in July 1946. In case Bormann was still alive, multiple public notices about the upcoming Nuremberg trials were placed in newspapers and on the radio in October and November 1945 to notify him of the proceedings against him.

The trial got underway on 20 November 1945. Lacking evidence confirming Bormann's death, the International Military Tribunal tried him in absentia, as permitted under article 12 of their charter. He was charged with three counts: conspiracy to wage a war of aggression, war crimes, and crimes against humanity. His prosecution was assigned to Lieutenant Thomas F. Lambert Jr. and his defence to Friedrich Bergold. The prosecution stated that Bormann participated in planning and co-signed virtually all of the antisemitic legislation put forward by the regime. Bergold unsuccessfully proposed that the court could not convict Bormann because he was already dead. Due to the shadowy nature of Bormann's activities, Bergold was unable to refute the prosecution's assertions as to the extent of his involvement in decision making. Bormann was convicted of war crimes and crimes against humanity and acquitted of conspiracy to wage a war of aggression. On 15 October 1946, he was sentenced to death by hanging, with the provision that if he were later found alive, any new facts brought to light by that time could be taken into consideration to reduce or overturn the sentence.

Discovery of remains
Over the following decades, several organisations, including the CIA and West German government, attempted to locate Bormann without success. In 1964, the West German government offered a reward of 100,000 Deutsche Marks for information leading to Bormann's capture. Sightings were reported all over the world, including Australia, Denmark, Italy, and South America. In his autobiography, Nazi intelligence officer Reinhard Gehlen claimed that Bormann had been a Soviet spy and had escaped to Moscow. Nazi hunter Simon Wiesenthal believed that Bormann was living in South America. The West German government declared that its hunt for Bormann was over in 1971.

In 1963, a retired postal worker named Albert Krumnow told police that around 8 May 1945, the Soviets had ordered him and his colleagues to bury two bodies found near a railway bridge near Lehrter station (now Berlin Hauptbahnhof). One was dressed in a Wehrmacht uniform and the other was clad only in his underwear. On the second body, Krumnow's colleague Wagenpfohl found an SS doctor's paybook identifying him as Ludwig Stumpfegger. Wagenpfohl gave the paybook to his boss, postal chief Berndt, who turned it over to the Soviets. They in turn destroyed it. Wagenpfohl wrote to Stumpfegger's wife on 14 August 1945, informing her that her husband's body was "interred with the bodies of several other dead soldiers in the grounds of the Alpendorf in Berlin NW 40, Invalidenstrasse 63."

Excavations on 20–21 July 1965 at the site specified by Axmann and Krumnow failed to locate the bodies. However, on 7 December 1972, construction workers uncovered human remains near Lehrter station in West Berlin, only  from the spot where Krumnow claimed to have buried them. Upon autopsy, fragments of glass were found in the jaws of both skeletons, suggesting that the men had committed suicide by biting cyanide capsules to avoid capture. Dental records reconstructed from memory in 1945 by Hugo Blaschke identified one skeleton as Bormann's, and damage to the collarbone was consistent with injuries that Bormann's sons reported he had sustained in a riding accident in 1939. Forensic examiners determined that the size of the skeleton and shape of the skull were identical to Bormann's. Likewise, the second skeleton was deemed to be Stumpfegger's, since it was of similar height to his last known proportions. Composite photographs, in which images of the skulls were overlaid on photographs of the men's faces, were completely congruent. Facial reconstruction was undertaken in early 1973 on both skulls to confirm the identities of the bodies. Soon afterward, the West German government declared Bormann dead. The family was not permitted to cremate the body, in case further forensic examination later proved necessary.

The remains were conclusively identified as Bormann's in 1998 when German authorities ordered genetic testing on fragments of the skull. The testing was led by Wolfgang Eisenmenger, Professor of Forensic Science at Ludwig Maximilian University of Munich. Tests using DNA from one of his relatives identified the skull as that of Bormann. Bormann's remains were cremated and his ashes were scattered over the Baltic Sea on 16 August 1999.

Personal life
On 2 September 1929, Bormann married 19-year-old Gerda Buch (23 October 1909 – 23 March 1946), whose father, Major Walter Buch, served as a chairman of the Untersuchung und Schlichtungs-Ausschuss (USCHLA; Investigation and Settlement Committee), which was responsible for settling disputes within the party. Hitler was a frequent visitor to the Buch house, and it was here that Bormann met him. Hess and Hitler served as witnesses at his wedding. Bormann also had a series of mistresses, including Manja Behrens, an actress.

Martin and Gerda Bormann had ten children:
Martin Adolf Bormann (14 April 1930 – 11 March 2013); called Krönzi (short for Kronprinz, "crown prince"); born "Adolf Martin Bormann", named after Hitler, his godfather.
Ilse Bormann (9 July 1931 – 1958); named after her godmother, Ilse Hess. Later called Eike after Rudolf Hess's flight to Scotland.
Ehrengard Bormann (9 July 1931 – 1932); twin sister of the former.
Irmgard Bormann (born 25 July 1933).
Rudolf Gerhard Bormann (born 31 August 1934; named after his godfather Rudolf Hess). His name was changed to Helmut after Hess's flight to Scotland.
Heinrich Hugo Bormann (born 13 June 1936; named after his godfather Heinrich Himmler).
Eva Ute Bormann (born 4 May 1938).
Gerda Bormann (born 4 August 1940).
Fritz Hartmut Bormann (born 3 April 1942).
Volker Bormann (18 September 1943 – 1946).

Gerda Bormann and the children fled Obersalzberg for Italy on 25 April 1945 after an Allied air attack. She died of cancer on 23 March 1946, in Merano, Italy. Bormann's children survived the war, and were cared for in foster homes. The eldest son, Martin, was ordained a Roman Catholic priest and worked in Africa as a missionary. He later left the priesthood and married.

Nazi awards and decorations
 Frontbann Badge (1932)
 Golden Party Badge (1934)
 Olympic Games Decoration First Class (1936)
 Honour Chevron for the Old Guard
 SS-Honour Ring (1937)
 Honour Sword of the Reichsführer-SS (1937)
 Blood Order (1938)
 Nazi Party Long Service Award in Bronze and Silver
 Grand Officer and Knight of the Grand Cross of the Order of the Crown of Italy

See also
Glossary of Nazi Germany
List of Nazi Party leaders and officials
List SS-Obergruppenführer
SS-Standartenführer Wilhelm Zander, Bormann's adjutant

References
Informational notes

Citations

Bibliography

External links

Martin Bormann: "The Brown Eminence" by the Holocaust Education & Archive Research Team
 

 
1900 births
1945 suicides
20th-century Freikorps personnel
Kirchenkampf
Anti-Catholicism in Germany
Anti-Catholic activists
Anti-Christian sentiment in Europe
Antisemitism in Germany
Articles containing video clips
Critics of Christianity
Critics of the Catholic Church
Fugitives
Former Lutherans
German former Christians
German atheists
German people convicted of crimes against humanity
German people convicted of murder
Holocaust perpetrators
Members of the Reichstag of Nazi Germany
Nazi Party officials
Nazis sentenced to death in absentia
Nazis who committed suicide in Germany
People convicted by the International Military Tribunal in Nuremberg
People from the Province of Saxony
People from Harz (district)
Reichsleiters
SS-Obergruppenführer
1945 deaths